Barry Simms is a former professional rugby league footballer who played in the 1950s and 1960s.

Playing career

International honours
Barry Simms won a cap for Great Britain while at Leeds in 1962 against France.

Championship final appearances
Barry Simms played  in Leeds' 25-10 victory over Warrington in the Championship Final during the 1960–61 season at Odsal Stadium, Bradford on Saturday 20 May 1961, in front of a crowd of 52,177.

County Cup Final appearances
Barry Simms played  in Leeds' 24-20 victory over Wakefield Trinity in the 1958 Yorkshire County Cup Final during the 1958–59 season at Odsal Stadium, Bradford on Saturday 18 October 1958, and played  in the 9-19 defeat by Wakefield Trinity in the 1961 Yorkshire County Cup Final during the 1961–62 season at Odsal Stadium, Bradford on Saturday 11 November 1961.

References

External links
!Great Britain Statistics at englandrl.co.uk (statistics currently missing due to not having appeared for both Great Britain, and England)
Leeds RL legends reunited
Club History, Facts and Figures

Living people
English rugby league players
Great Britain national rugby league team players
Leeds Rhinos players
Place of birth missing (living people)
Rugby league hookers
Year of birth missing (living people)